Shockwave (Lancaster Sneed) is a fictional character appearing in American comic books published by Marvel Comics.

Publication history

Shockwave's first appearance was in Master of Kung Fu #42 (July 1976), and he was created by Tom Sutton, Doug Moench and Paul Gulacy.

Fictional character biography
Lancaster Sneed was born in Newcastle-on-Tyne, England, and is the nephew of Sir Denis Nayland Smith. Before becoming an intelligence agent for the British agency MI-6, he was a carnival performer. After he stole an experimental exoskeleton, he became the professional criminal and mercenary known as Shockwave. He conspired to kill his uncle and Black Jack Tarr, and first battled Shang-Chi. He was revealed as Smith's nephew and was defeated by Shang Chi.

He apparently returned later, and Shang Chi thought he was fighting the real Shockwave but was in fact it was a robot duplicate being controlled by Doctor Doom. The real Shockwave was later brainwashed by MI-6, and attacked his uncle, and battled Clive Reston and Shang-Chi. Alongside Brynocki, Shockwave battled Shang Chi and Leiko Wu on Mordillo Island. When Brynocki turns against him, Shockwave battled Brynocki and his robots alongside Shang Chi, Leiko Wu, and Black Jack Tarr.

Alongside Zaran and Razor Fist, Shockwave later attacked the West Coast Avengers on behalf of the S.H.I.E.L.D. Deltoids, but was defeated by Iron Man and escaped. Shockwave attended the A.I.M. Weapons Exposition, and battled Captain America alongside the other costumed criminals there.

As Shockwave he has been a member of the Oriental Expediters and the Golden Dagger Sect. He has been the ally of many masterminds and criminals including Fah Lo Suee, Tarrant/Griswold, and Fu Manchu.

The second Crimson Cowl recruited Shockwave to join her incarnation of the Masters of Evil.

He was later involved in a R.A.I.D terror plot in London, only to be foiled by Union Jack.

During the height of the "Civil War" storyline, he was captured by Heroes for Hire. Lancaster has been identified as one of the 142 registered superheroes who have registered as part of the Fifty State Initiative.

Someone that looks like Shockwave was among the members of Hood's Crime Syndicate. He was defeated by the New Avengers, but he escaped from jail. 

He recently appeared in Brand New Day as one of the villains in the Bar With No Name.

During the "Secret Invasion" storyline, Shockwave is one of the villains incarcerated in The Raft when the Skrulls strike. He is one among many supervillains who rejoined The Hood's crime syndicate and attacked an invading Skrull force.

During the "Dark Reign" storyline, Quasimodo analyzed the information on Shockwave for Norman Osborn. He joins with the Hood's gang in an attack on the New Avengers, who were expecting the Dark Avengers instead. The gang was then sent on a mission to kill Tony Stark, promised mountains of gold bars from Norman Osborn as reward for the first one who does. Shockwave is able to locate Tony in Bayeux, France but is incapacitated at close range.

He was seen during the Siege of Asgard as part of the Hood crime syndicate.

During the "Avengers: Standoff!" storyline, Shockwave was an inmate of Pleasant Hill, a gated community established by S.H.I.E.L.D.

During the "Search for Tony Stark" arc, Shockwave is seen as a member of Hood's gang as they attack Castle Doom. He and Rampage held Doctor Doom's arms as Wrecker works to break open his Iron Man armor.

Shockwave is part of a group of Shang-Chi's enemies that includes Razor Fist, Shen Kuei, Death-Hand, Shadow Stalker, Tiger-Claw and led by Shang-Chi's adoptive brother Midnight Sun that ambushes the Master of Kung Fu and Domino while the two are on a date in Hong Kong.  Shockwave is defeated after one of his shocks aimed for Domino misses and hits Shadow-Stalker, whose flail is deflected off of a serving tray thrown by Domino and hits Shockwave in the face, knocking him out. After the fight, Shang-Chi warns the group to retreat and forget the ambush ever took place or to face further attacks from Domino.

Powers and abilities
Lancaster Sneed is a master of various martial arts, especially karate. He was trained in armed and unarmed combat by British military intelligence. He is an expert on electrical devices, and skilled in demolitions work. His body was surgically rebuilt using metal plates, enhancing his strength, speed, agility, stamina, durability and reflexes, but not to superhuman levels. He wears a stolen exoskeleton body armor suit which is equipped with an apparatus that generates electrical shocks on contact.

The suit is later waterproofed to prevent shorting out on contact with water.

In other media

Television
A variation of Shockwave appears in the Iron Man: Armored Adventures episode "Armor Wars". This version is a member of Obadiah Stane's Guardsmen, was a former Maggia enforcer, and has an Australian accent.

Video games
 Shockwave makes a minor appearance in Marvel Avengers Alliance as a victim of the Circle of Eight.
 Shockwave appears in Captain America: The Winter Soldier - The Official Game. This version is a member of the terrorist organization R.A.I.D.

References

External links
 Shockwave at Marvel.com
 

Characters created by Doug Moench
Comics characters introduced in 1976
Comics characters introduced in 1982
Cyborg supervillains
Fictional English people
Fictional mercenaries in comics
Fictional people from Newcastle upon Tyne
Marvel Comics characters with superhuman strength
Marvel Comics cyborgs
Marvel Comics supervillains
Shang-Chi characters